The yellowhammer is Emberiza citrinella, a species of Old World passerine bird.

Yellowhammer may also refer to:
 A regional name for the yellow shafted subspecies (Colaptes auratus auratus) of the northern flicker, a North American woodpecker
 Yellowhammer, a nickname for someone from Alabama
 Yellowhammer News, a conservative news website in Alabama
 Yellow hammer, 12–6 curveball in baseball 
 Operation Yellowhammer, contingency plan for a "no-deal" Brexit